Solna Vikings was a Swedish professional basketball club with a men's team and a women's team. Both played in their respective top leagues: the women in the Damligan, and the men in the Swedish Basketball League.

History
The Solna Vikings was founded on 27 April 1999, when Solna IF announced that it would not continue playing. Solna Vikings Men won the Swedish men's national championship in 2003, and the women won the national championship in 2002, 2004 and 2006. 

On 6 July 2015 it was announced that the men's team was leaving the Swedish Basketball League because of economic problems. In June 2016, the club merged with AIK Basket.

Men's team

Trophies
Basketligan

Champions (1):  2002–03

Notable players

Women's team

Trophies
Basketligan dam
Champions (3):  2001–02, 2003–04, 2005–06

Notable players

See also
 2008–09 EuroCup Women

References

External links
Solna Vikings website

Basketball teams in Sweden
Sporting clubs in Stockholm
1999 establishments in Sweden
Basketball teams established in 1999